Albert Michael Blatnik (May 2, 1923 – February 25, 2011) was an American football and basketball coach. He spent three seasons as the head football coach at West Liberty University, where he compiled a 13–12–1 from 1959 to 1961. He also served as the head basketball coach at West Liberty for the 1957–58 and 1958–59, tallying a mark of a 31–21.

Head coaching record

Football

References

External links
 Obituary

1923 births
2011 deaths
West Liberty Hilltoppers football coaches
West Liberty Hilltoppers men's basketball coaches
People from Bridgeport, Ohio